Tricholoma fulvum is a mushroom of the agaric genus Tricholoma. One guide reports that the species is inedible, while another says the fruit bodies are edible.

It is a pale brown to reddish-brown mushroom with crimped hat edges. Gills are yellowy-white and get brown spots. The spore powder is white. The stem brown externally, and hollow and yellow internally. It grows mycorrhizally with birch-trees.

See also
List of North American Tricholoma
List of Tricholoma species

References

fulvum
Fungi described in 1792
Fungi of North America